Lyndhurst is a small village in New South Wales, Australia  in Blayney Shire. It is 4 kilometres west of Mandurama or about 269 km west of Sydney and 63 km south-west of Bathurst just off the Mid-Western Highway New South Wales. Once serving as the major centre for basic goods and needs to the nearby Junction Reefs goldfields.

Lyndhurst was one of the ten areas (including Albury, Armidale, Bombala, Dalgety, Lake George, Orange, Tooma, Tumut and Yass-Canberra) shortlisted in 1908 as sites for the national capital.

Lyndhurst today

Lyndhurst today boasts the still functioning Royal Hotel, a combined service station/general store and a takeaway.

Heritage listings
Lyndhurst has a number of heritage-listed sites, including:
 Belubula River: Junction Reefs Dam

References

External links

Towns in New South Wales
Blayney Shire
Blayney–Demondrille railway line
Mining towns in New South Wales

Proposed sites for national capital of Australia